Sneaky Pete is an American crime drama series created by David Shore and Bryan Cranston.

Sneaky Pete may also refer to:

 Sneaky Pete (cue), a two-piece cue constructed to resemble a house cue, with a near-invisible wood-to-wood joint
 Sneaky Pete Kleinow (1934–2007), American musician
 Sneaky Pete's, a chain of hot-dog restaurants